The women's heptathlon event at the 1994 World Junior Championships in Athletics was held in Lisbon, Portugal, at Estádio Universitário de Lisboa on 22 and 23 July.

Medalists

Results

Final
22/23 July

Participation
According to an unofficial count, 21 athletes from 15 countries participated in the event.

References

Heptathlon
Combined events at the World Athletics U20 Championships